Dr Charles Butler Grace (26 March 1882 – 6 June 1938) was an English first-class cricketer who was the third-born son of W. G. Grace. He was named after Charles Butler, a Tasmanian cricketer with whom W. G. Grace had stayed in 1873-74 and who became a friend.

He attended Clifton College, playing for the school's first eleven cricket team in 1898–99. He played four first-class matches for London County in 1900 and W. G. Grace's XI in 1906. Grace was an exponent of lob bowling, and continued this practice well after it had become uncommon in first-class matches. His matches for London County were played alongside his father and brother, W. G. Grace junior. He also participated in his father's last cricket match, for Eltham against Grove Park in July 1914, scoring four runs opening the batting. He died in Sussex in 1938.

References

1882 births
1938 deaths
English cricketers
London County cricketers
People educated at Clifton College
Cricketers from Bristol
W. G. Grace
Charles
W. G. Grace's XI cricketers